Awards and decorations of Nazi Germany were military, political and civilian decorations that were bestowed between 1923 and 1945, first by the Nazi Party and later the state of Nazi Germany.

The first awards began in the 1920s, before the Nazis had come to national power in Germany, with the political decorations worn on Party uniforms, along with any awards they may have earned during the First World War or before.

After 1933, the state began issuing a variety of civilian decorations, which could be bestowed upon any citizen of Germany. Thus, some awards (such as Sports Badges) were bestowed on Nazi Party members, members of the German military, and regular civilians. Many standard awards of the German state, such as life-saving medals, were redesigned to incorporate the Nazi symbol, the swastika.

A number of military awards were established pre-war, including Wehrmacht long service decorations, followed by awards for participation in the Spanish Civil War and for the annexation of Austria and the Sudetenland, with the greatest number established after the start of World War II in 1939. Regulations of award also permitted the simultaneous wear of military, civilian, and political decorations on any military or para-military uniform of Nazi Germany.

Nazi awards and decorations were discontinued after the defeat of Nazi Germany in 1945, with display of the swastika banned. In 1957 the Federal Republic of Germany permitted qualifying veterans to wear many Nazi-era awards in Bundeswehr uniform. including most World War II valor and campaign awards, provided the swastika symbol was removed. This led to the re-design of many awards with, for example, the swastika being replaced by a three-leafed oakleaf cluster on the Iron Cross and by the date 1939 on the War Merit Cross. In addition, new military awards were created for post war service by both the West German and East German governments.

Orders and decorations

State orders

War decorations: pre 1939

War decorations: 1939–1945
These awards were bestowed by the Wehrmacht and Waffen-SS between 1939 and 1945, during World War II.

Military service decorations

Military long service medals

Arm shields

Campaign cuff titles

Military and paramilitary badges

Army/ war badges

Naval war badges

badges & other awards

The Luftwaffe maintained two non-portable awards, the "Honor Goblet of the Luftwaffe" and the "Luftwaffe Honor Plate". Recipients of both awards automatically received the Luftwaffe Honour Roll Clasp in January 1944.

Foreign volunteer awards

Order of precedence
Within the Wehrmacht, wartime awards took precedence over peacetime decorations.

 Grand Cross of the Iron Cross
 Knight's Cross of the Iron Cross with Oak Leaves (and higher)
 Golden Knights Cross of the War Merit Cross
 Knight's Cross of the Iron Cross
 Knights Cross of the War Merit Cross
 German Cross
 Honour Roll Clasp
 Führer Commendation Certificate
 Honor Goblet & Plate of the Luftwaffe
 Iron Cross 1st Class
 War Merit Cross 1st Class
 Iron Cross 2nd Class
 Combat Clasp
 Numbered war badges
 Wound Badge
 Tank Destruction Badge
 Unnumbered war badges
 Campaign shields & cuff titles
 War Merit Cross 2nd Class
 Ostvolk Decoration
 Eastern Front Medal
 War Merit Medal
 Cross of Honor (1914–1918)
 Spanish Cross
 Qualification badges
 Long-service awards
 Commemorative medals
 West Wall Medal
 Foreign decorations

See also
 Political decorations of the Nazi Party

Notes

References 
Citations

Bibliography

External links
 WW2 German Medals and Awards Guide